The 2022 CAF Women's Champions League was the 2nd edition of the annual African women's association football club tournament organized by CAF held in Morocco from 30 October to 13 November 2022. The winners of this edition will automatically qualify for the following edition of the tournament.

Mamelodi Sundowns were the defending champions after claiming the inaugural edition title, but was dethroned after losing 0–4 to AS FAR in the final. With the first title, AS FAR officially qualified for the 2023 CAF Women's Champions League.

Qualified Teams

The qualification phases were made up of 6 sub-confederation qualifying tournaments which ran from 7 August to 16 September 2022 with each confederation having a representative. As defending champions, Mamelodi Sundowns qualified automatically for the main phase of the tournament.

Draw
The draw of this edition of the tournament was held at the Mohammed VI Technical Centre in Rabat, Morocco on 9 September 2022 at 11:30 CET (10:30 UTC). The 7 confirmed teams and the unknown UNIFFAC champion at the time of the draw were drawn into two groups of four teams. As club competition hosts, AS FAR was allocated to position A1.

Venues
On 16 October 2022, CAF indicated that this edition of the tournament will be held in Rabat and Marrakesh.

Match officials
Referees 

  Suavis Iratunga
  Zomadre Kore
  Shahenda El-Maghrabi
  Fatima El Ajjani
  Antsino Twanyanyukwa
  Ndidi Patience Madu
  Mame Faye
  Akhona Makalima
  Vincentina Amedomé
  Shamira Nabadda

Assistant referees

  Asma Ouahab
  Nafissatou Yekini
  Carine Atezambong
  Mireille Mujanayi
  Pélagie Rakotozafinoro
  Bernadettar Kwimbira
  Fanta Kone 
  Mariem Chedad
  Ihsane Nouali
  Karima Khadiri
  Houda Afine
  Diana Chikotesha

Video assistant referees

  Ahmed El Ghandour
  Daniel Nii Ayi Laryea
  Dahane Beida
  Imtehaz Heeralall
  Samir Guezzaz
  Zakaria Brindisi
  Haythem Guirat

Group stage
The group stage kick-off times are in West Africa Time (WAT) (UTC+01:00).

Group A

Group B

Knockout phase

Semi-finals

Third-place match

Final

Statistics

Top scorers 
This is the list of the top ten scorers in the main phase of this tournament:

Final standings
Per statistical convention in football, matches decided in extra time are counted as wins and losses, while matches decided by a penalty shoot-out are counted as draws.

 

|-
| colspan="11"| Eliminated in group stage
|-

 
|}

Awards
The CAF Women's Champions League technical study group selected the following as the best of the tournament.

See also
 2022 AFC Women's Club Championship (Asia)
 2022 Copa Libertadores Femenina (South America)
 2021–22 and 2022–23 UEFA Women's Champions League (Europe)

References

External links

2022 CAF Women's Champions League
2021–22 in African football
2022 in women's association football